Georg Wilhelm Richmann (22 July 1711 – 6 August 1753), (Old Style: 11 July 1711 – 26 July 1753) was a Baltic German physicist. Richmann did pioneering work on electricity, atmospheric electricity, and calorimetry. He died by electrocution in St. Petersburg when struck by apparent ball lightning produced by an experiment attempting to ground the electrical discharge from a storm.

Early life and education
Georg Wilhelm Richmann was born on 22 July 1711 (Old Style, 11 July 1711) in the city of Pernau (today Pärnu, Estonia) in Swedish Livonia. Richmann's father died of plague before he was born, and his mother remarried. In his early years he studied in Reval (today's Tallinn, Estonia); later he studied in Germany at the universities of Halle and Jena.

Career

Richmann performed pioneering work on electricity and atmospheric electricity, and also worked on calorimetry, collaborating with Mikhail Lomonosov. Richmann also worked as a tutor to the children of Count Andrei Osterman.  Richmann translated Alexander Pope's Essay on Man into German from French, which appeared in 1741. In that year, he was also elected a member of the St. Petersburg Academy of Sciences.

Accidental death
Richmann was electrocuted in St. Petersburg on 6 August 1753 (Old Style, 26 July 1753) while "trying to quantify the response of an insulated rod to a nearby storm." He is said to have been attending a meeting of the Academy of Sciences when he heard thunder, whereupon he ran home with his engraver to capture the event for posterity.  While the experiment was underway, a discharge reported to have been ball lightning appeared and collided with Richmann's head leaving him with a red spot on his forehead, his shoes blown open, and parts of his clothes singed. The ball lightning arising from the apparatus was the cause of his death. An explosion followed "like that of a small Cannon" that knocked the engraver out, split the room's door frame, and tore the door off its hinges. Richmann was apparently the first person in history to die while conducting electrical experiments.

References

1711 births
1753 deaths
People from Pärnu
People from Swedish Livonia
Baltic-German people
18th-century German physicists
18th-century German inventors
Physicists from the Russian Empire
Inventors from the Russian Empire
Full members of the Saint Petersburg Academy of Sciences
Deaths from lightning strikes
University of Halle alumni
University of Jena alumni
Accidental deaths in Russia